Asti is a city and  in Italy.

Asti may also refer to:
Asti (wine)
Asti (restaurant), a defunct Italian restaurant, with opera-singing waiters, in New York City.
Asti, California
Province of Asti
Alfredo Asti, Uruguayan politician
Adriana Asti, Italian actress

ASTI may also refer to:
AŞTİ, the Ankara Intercity Bus Terminal.
AŞTİ (Ankara Metro), the metro station at the bus terminal.
Association of Secondary Teachers of Ireland
Ascent Solar Technologies, Inc., a solar panels company located in Colorado.
Agricultural Science and Technology Indicators, a source of information on agricultural research and development (R&D) statistics.
ASTi may also refer to:
Advanced Simulation Technology, Inc., a company specializing in digital audio systems for flight simulators located in Herndon, Virginia.